Judy Gap is an unincorporated community in Pendleton County, West Virginia, United States. The Judy Rocks geological formation is just to the south. North Fork Mountain is to the east, and the North Fork of the South Branch of the Potomac River is to the west, with Spruce Mountain and Spruce Knob beyond the river. Most of the surrounding land is within the Monongahela National Forest.

References

Unincorporated communities in Pendleton County, West Virginia
Unincorporated communities in West Virginia